The 1982–83 Combined Counties Football League season was the fifth in the history of the Combined Counties Football League, a football competition in England.

After several new clubs joined before the previous season, the league was split into two divisions – East and West. With a number of clubs leaving the league at the end of that season, it reverted to a single division. The league was won by Hartley Wintney for the first time.

League table

The league was reduced from 22 to 18 clubs after Clarion, Lightwater, Sheerwater and Wrecclesham all left to join the new Surrey Premier League and no new clubs joined.

References

External links
 Combined Counties League Official Site

1982-83
1982–83 in English football leagues